The Uzh (translit. Uzh; ;)  is a river in Ukraine and Slovakia. Its name comes from the ancient west Slavic dialect word už, meaning "Snake", (lat. "Serpentes").

The Uzh is a tributary of the Laborets River, a river that flows in the Tysa Lowland in Zakarpattia Oblast of western Ukraine. The river feeds numerous industries and is a source of drinking water and irrigation. It also has a hydropower station on it. Several important cities lie along its course, including Uzhhorod.

It flows into the Laborec river near the city of Drahňov in the Michalovce District (okres).

The Ukrainian city of Uzhhorod and the semi-ruined Nevitske Castle are situated by the Uzh. The river forms part of the Slovakia–Ukraine border for about  near the village of Pinkovce.

Regions 

The Uzh is located in the Zakarpattia Oblast in Ukraine and in the districts of Michalovce and Sobrance in eastern Slovakia.

Geography 

The largest tributaries are,
Right: , Strychavka, Ulychka, Ubľa, Kamyanitsa, Dvernitsky, Domaarach, Volshava, Syry Potyk, Hachnyk.
Left: Unnamed, Tur'ya, .

The meander is winding, moderately branched. There are low waterfalls and many islands.

Etymology 

Etymologists disagree about the origin of the name of the river. Some would derive it from the Slavic name of the grass snake (Ukrainian and Belarusian вуж, Russian уж, from Old East Slavic ꙋжь, Proto-Slavic ǫžь), which is abundant in the valley of the river. However, the expected cognate form in Slovak would be *Už (compare Slovak užovka "adder") while the actual Slovak form of the name is Uh. Another possibility is that the name derives from a Proto-Indo-European root meaning "angle" or "corner" (the etymological source of Ukrainian вугол, Slovak uhol).

References 

Rivers of Slovakia
Rivers of Zakarpattia Oblast
International rivers of Europe
Slovakia–Ukraine border